Michel Guéranger (born November 14, 1941, in Houilles Carrières-sur-Seine) is a painter, graphic designer and photographer. After graduating from the 'Ecole Nationale Supérieure des Arts Appliqués et des Métiers d'Art', he devoted himself entirely to his passion for art. At age 25, a series of oil paintings on paper, signed under the name Michel Gérard, constituted his first exhibition, which traveled from Paris to London. 1975 – Guéranger founds the group SPACE with Jean Allemand and Maxime Defert. Through an innovative discourse, these forerunners of the 3D image explored the problematics of space: physics of shapes, art of tension, space-time hypergeometry and vibratory masses of light.

Collections 
His public collections includes:
National Contemporary Art Acquisitions Fonds national d’art contemporain
Museum of Modern Art, City of Paris. France
Georges Pompidou Center. Paris. France
Dunkirk Museum of Modern Art. Dunkirk. France
Museum of Saint-Maur. France
Copenhagen Handelsbankens Kunstforening Collection. Denmark

References

External links 
 Past Auction Results for Michel Gueranger Art
Michel Gueranger Painter, Graphic designer, Photographe

Living people
20th-century French painters
20th-century French male artists
French male painters
21st-century French painters
21st-century French male artists
French contemporary artists
1941 births